The Whisper in the Gloom is a 1954 detective novel by Cecil Day-Lewis, written under the pen name of Nicholas Blake. It is the eleventh in a series of novels featuring the private detective Nigel Strangeways. The novel introduced the recurring character of Clare Massinger, a young sculptress, who becomes a romantic interest of Strangeways.

It was adapted into a 1980 American television film The Kids Who Knew Too Much produced by Disney. It relocated the setting of the action from London to Los Angeles and dropped the character of Strangeways from the plot.

Synopsis
With an important Soviet delegation heading to London, a boy in Kensington Gardens accidentally stumbles across a plot to wreck Anglo-Russian relations.

References

Bibliography
 Bargainnier, Earl F. Twelve Englishmen of Mystery. Popular Press, 1984.
 Reilly, John M. Twentieth Century Crime & Mystery Writers. Springer, 2015.
 Stanford, Peter. C Day-Lewis: A Life. A&C Black, 2007.

1954 British novels
Novels by Cecil Day-Lewis
British crime novels
British thriller novels
Collins Crime Club books
British detective novels
Novels set in London